Private Label Strategy: How to Meet the Store Brand Challenge is a book by Nirmalya Kumar and Jan Benedict Steenkamp.  This book describes the strategies for private labels that major retailers are using, and analyses how major national brands can mount a response.

References

External links
Private Label Strategy

Brand management
Store brands
Branding terminology
Business books
Marketing books
Product management
Types of branding
2007 non-fiction books